The Grand Rapids Swing Bridge is a four span Pratt truss railroad swing bridge in Grand Rapids, Michigan.  It was built in 1902 for the Pere Marquette Railroad as a swing bridge to allow steamboats to pass up the Grand River, but this river traffic was discontinued in 1907.  The turntable is rusted shut and currently inoperable.  Originally it was built as a double track bridge, but one set of tracks has been removed.   The bridge itself is still in use, and carries an Amtrak train which runs from the Amtrak station just east of the bridge, as well as CSX freight trains.
In crossing the Grand River, it touches the south end of a small island.

References

CSX Transportation bridges
Buildings and structures in Grand Rapids, Michigan
Transportation in Grand Rapids, Michigan
Swing bridges in the United States
Railroad bridges in Michigan
Steel bridges in the United States
Pratt truss bridges in the United States
Transportation buildings and structures in Kent County, Michigan